The 19th Continental Regiment was a unit of the Connecticut Line in the 1776 establishment of the Continental Army.  It is a successor to Webb's Connecticut Regiment (also known as the 7th Connecticut Provincial Regiment), which was part of the 1775 establishment, and it continued to be commanded by Col. Charles Webb.  Active during the New York and New Jersey campaign, it was on the lines but did not fight at the Battle of Long Island.  It saw action at the Battle of White Plains and retreated with George Washington's army to Pennsylvania in late 1776.  It then participated in the Battle of Trenton.  Some of its men chose to overstay their enlistment and also saw action in the Battle of the Assunpink Creek and the Battle of Princeton in early 1777.

With the reorganization of the Continental Army at the end of 1776, the regiment became the 2nd Connecticut Regiment.

References
Connecticut Historical Society. The Record of Connecticut Men in the Military and Naval Service During the War of the Revolution, 1775-1783, p. 104.

External links
Bibliography of Connecticut's participation in the Continental Army compiled by the United States Army Center of Military History

Connecticut regiments of the Continental Army
Military units and formations established in 1776
Military units and formations disestablished in 1776